Lim Sung-bin (born September 12, 1987), better known by the stage name Beenzino (Hangul: 빈지노), is a South Korean rapper. His stage name is a play on that of Boston rapper Benzino, combined with "빈" (pronounced "been") from his birth name. Beenzino made his first official public appearance at Dok2's Hustle Real Hard Concert on June 5, 2011, and has since released three solo albums, as well as other works in collaboration with hip hop producers Primary and Shimmy Twice, and as the duo Hot Clip with South Korean rapper Beatbox DG. He is noted for his melodic style of rapping.

After establishing his reputation within the Korean rap scene, he became well known through singles such as "Dali, Van, Picasso", which was a mainstream hit. Beenzino toured as a solo artist in the U.S. in 2015.

History

Early life and career beginnings 
Beenzino spent most of his childhood in Christchurch, New Zealand and moved to Korea before middle school, which he attended in Yangpyeong, Gyeonggi province. He enrolled at Seoul National University to study sculpture, and graduated in 2014.

He first gained recognition by posting recordings to the DC Tribe website, through which he was first recruited by established rapper Simon Dominic. He went on to feature on albums by well-known artists including Dok2, Epik High, Supreme Team, and Verbal Jint, and released albums as part of the rap duos Jazzyfact (with producer Shimmy Twice) and Hotclip (with Beatbox DG).

Debut as a solo artist 
Beenzino made his debut as a solo MC on hip hop producer Primary's collaborative album P’Skool’s Daily Apartment, released July 28, 2009. By 2011, he was a respected solo artist, although still a rookie by industry standards. In October, he featured on Primary's 2011 album Primary and the Messengers.

In 2012, Beenzino released his first solo album, 24:26, and performed with Illionaire Records during their nationwide Korean tour that summer. In November, he collaborated with label-mates The Quiett and Dok2 in the free digital single "Illionaire Gang", which was released to coincide with their November 11 Illionaire Day Concert.

In 2013, the pre-release of his single "Dali, Van, Picasso" from his 2014 album Up All Night was downloaded almost 600,000 times without a music video, and propelled him to mainstream success. He went on to perform at MU:Con 2013 and featured on albums by K.Will (The Third Album Part 2: Love Blossom) and Lee Hyori (Monochrome).

In April 2014, he featured on the Junggigo song "Want U", which was a number one hit in Korea and sold over a million copies. He also performed at the 2014 Asian Music Festival on May 25 in New York City and the One Hip Hop Festival at Hongik University, and as a featured guest during Verbal Jint's international concert tour.

In 2016, he released his third album, 12, including the prior releases "Dali, Van, Picasso", "We Are Going To", and "Break".

In 2020, Beenzino left Illionaire Records and joined fellow rapper and friend E Sens after signing with Beasts and Natives Alike in 2021.

Personal life 
In August 2022, Beenzino registered his marriage to model Stefanie Michova, and the wedding has yet to be decided.

Discography

Studio albums

Extended plays

Singles

Singles as a featured artist

Awards

References

External links
 

1987 births
Living people
South Korean male rappers
South Korean hip hop singers
21st-century South Korean  male singers
South Korean male singer-songwriters